Ooperipatellus nanus is a species of velvet worm in the family Peripatopsidae.  This species is endemic to New Zealand and is found in the South Island.

Taxonomy
This species was first described by Hilke Ruhberg in 1985.

Description 
Ooperipatellus nanus is a small species of velvet worm that grows to a length of approximately 10 mm. This species is tan or brown in color on its back but yellow on its underside. It is oviparous and has 13 pairs of legs, which is the minimum number found in the phylum Onychophora.

Distribution 
Ooperipatellus nanus has only been found in Southland, in the Takitimu Mountains.

Life cycle 
This species produce young by laying eggs from which the young subsequently hatch.

Host species 
Ooperipatellus nanus are found mainly in rotting beech logs.

Conservation status 
This species has been classified as having the "At Risk, Naturally Uncommon" conservation status under the New Zealand Threat Classification System.

References

External links

Images of O. nanus.

Onychophorans of Australasia
Onychophoran species
Animals described in 1985
Worms of New Zealand
Endemic fauna of New Zealand
Endemic worms of New Zealand